Colegio San Ignacio is a Chilean high school located in Machalí, Cachapoal Province, Chile.

The school has 451 students as of 2012. Its principal is Roxana Pérez Núñez, the president of the parents' center (centro de padres) is Víctor Calderón, and the president of the students' center (centro de alumnos) is Amara Arroyo. It possesses an administrative staff and teachers of 62 people. Colegio San Ignacio was founded in 1991.

References

External links
 Colegio San Ignacio 

Educational institutions established in 1991
Secondary schools in Chile
Schools in Cachapoal Province
Primary schools in Chile
1991 establishments in Chile